The men's team soft tennis event was part of the soft tennis programme and took place between 11 and 13 December 1998, at the Thammasat Tennis Field.

Schedule
All times are Indochina Time (UTC+07:00)

Results

Round robin

Pool A

Pool B

5th–6th place

5th–6th semifinals

5th–6th final

Final round

Semifinals

3rd–4th place

Final

Non-participating athletes

References 

Results
Results

External links 
soft-tennis.org

Soft tennis at the 1998 Asian Games